Livarjan (also Romanized as Līvārjān; also known as Līvār) is a village in Ersi Rural District of the Central District of Jolfa County, East Azerbaijan province, Iran. At the 2006 National Census, its population was 1,519 in 426 households. The following census in 2011 counted 1,450 people in 457 households. The latest census in 2016 showed a population of 1,900 people in 652 households; it was the largest village in its rural district.

References 

Jolfa County

Populated places in East Azerbaijan Province

Populated places in Jolfa County